Patricia Brocker (née Grigoli, born 7 April 1966) is a former German footballer who played as a forward. She participated with the German team at the 1996 Summer Olympics.

Life 
Patricia Brocker played as a student for FSV Jägersburg, later for VfR 09 Saarbrücken and TuS Niederkirchen. Her biggest club level success was the German Championship in 1993. In 1992, she debuted for the Germany women's national football team in a match against Italy. Brocker scored 31 goals in her 46 appearances, her last against Brazil in 1996. She won the European Championship in 1995 and was runner-up at the 1995 Women's World Cup. She also participated with the German team at the 1996 Summer Olympics. In 2001, she returned to her youth club FSV Jägersburg.

References

External links 
 Profile at soccerdonna.de

1966 births
Living people
German women's footballers
Germany women's international footballers
1995 FIFA Women's World Cup players
Footballers at the 1996 Summer Olympics
German footballers needing infoboxes
Olympic footballers of Germany
UEFA Women's Championship-winning players
Women's association football forwards
1. FFC 08 Niederkirchen players